Asim Basu was an Indian theatre artiste and director, actor, art director, painter and playwright. Basu was known for his set design work in Ollywood movies and designing Odia book covers and movie posters.

Early life
He was born in 1935, to Motilal Basu and Bijanbala Basu in Kakhada village, Bhogarai, Balasore district. When Basu was in Kolkata during his college days, he chanced to work with actor Utpal Dutt in Minerva Theatre, Kolkata and his talents flourished in acting, direction and stage designing there. He came back to Odisha and formed a theatre group “Rupakar”.

Career
Basu made his debut in play as a director with Bijay Mishra's 'Duiti Surya Dagdha Phula Ku Nei'. He directed around 200 plays. He has worked as a stage designer for over 500 plays and was the art director for several Odia films. He was an art-director in films like Chha Mana Atha Guntha, Indradhanura Chhai and Shodh (Hindi). He also made his appearances in many Tele films and films like Chha Mana Atha Guntha, Jaga Balia and Dadagiri.

Death
A fund was raised by state government’s Culture department and Khordha district administration for his treatment.
Basu died from lung infection on 1 February 2017 in Bhubaneswar, Odisha at the age of 81.

Filmography

In popular culture
 'Asim Basu Memorial Award' presented by Nandanik, a Theatre group based in Koraput, Odisha was given to encourage the young theatre artist.

Awards
 Basu was awarded the state Sangeet Natak Akademi Award in 1998.
 He was awarded with Parampara Samman in 2012.

External links

References 

1935 births
2017 deaths
Indian production designers
Indian male painters
Odia dramatists and playwrights
People from Balasore district
20th-century Indian painters
20th-century Indian designers
20th-century Indian dramatists and playwrights
Dramatists and playwrights from Odisha
Painters from Odisha
20th-century Indian male artists
Respiratory disease deaths in India
Infectious disease deaths in India
Deaths from respiratory tract infection